Sven Erlandsson (1768–1853) was a Swedish artist (tapestry maker).

Son of the gardener Erland Hallberg and Anna Maria Kristoffersdotter and the brother of Katarina Erlandsdotter (1771-1848) and Lisa Erlandsdotter (1774–1854); the three siblings all became known as artists, and are counted among the most prominent within their craft in 18th-century Sweden. He made bonadsmålning, a Swedish art form, which is a type of painted tapestry of textile used for decoration, largely among the peasantry. 

He lived his entire life in the countryside at Mårdaklev in Älvsborgs län.

References 

  Svenskt konstnärslexikon (Swedish Art dictionary) Allhems Förlag, Malmö (1952) 

1768 births
1853 deaths
People from Svenljunga Municipality
Swedish women artists
Swedish textile artists
18th-century Swedish artists
18th-century Swedish male artists
19th-century textile artists
18th-century textile artists